

References and notes

Notes

Primary references

Secondary references

See also
List of monastic houses in Ireland

Leitrim
Monastic houses
Monastic houses
Monastic houses